Phymorhynchus coseli is a species of sea snail, a marine gastropod mollusk in the family Raphitomidae.

Description
The length of the shell attains 64 mm.

Distribution
This species occurs at methane seeps in deep water off the Congo River.

References

coseli
Gastropods described in 2009